Emek Tzurim National Park (lit. Valley of Flints) is a national park in East Jerusalem.

Location

Emek Tzurim National Park is located on the lower western slope of the Mount of Olives and Mount Scopus and the upper reaches of the Kidron Valley, and abuts the neighborhoods of Wadi al-Joz, At-Tur and Beit Orot, as well as the campus of Brigham Young University Jerusalem Center. The grounds cover 170,000 square meters.

Temple Mount Sifting Project
In 2004—2017, the park housed the Temple Mount Sifting Project, where visitors participate in sifting soil from the Temple Mount in search of archaeological artifacts. When this project moved to a different locale, the facility was renamed the Ancient Jerusalem Sifting Project and engages in sifting finds from other archaeological excavations in Jerusalem.

See also
National parks and nature reserves of Israel

References

National parks of Israel
Parks in East Jerusalem